Watch the Duck (WTD, stylized as WATCH THE DUCK),  is an American musical duo from Montgomery, Alabama, United States. They are part of the alternative R&B movement. In 2012,  the group dominated the freshman music poll on mtvU and their song "Poppin’ Off" was added to their regular rotation. The group is currently signed to i am OTHER (Pharrell Williams' record label) and Interscope Records music label. Since 2015, the publishing interest of Watch the Duck's catalog has been represented by Reservoir Media Management. For their first 2018 single, the producer-vocalist pair released a song titled "There You Are". The sound of the new single is described as "a more intimate and personal sound starring Jesse's R&B vocal" and a "feel-good record that encourages listeners to stay in the moment, and move with whatever feelings come from being in the present."

History
Watch the Duck was formed by friends Eddie Smith III, Jesse Rankins, and former member Jonathan Wells. All three were DJs, producers, and musicians originally from Montgomery, Alabama but moved to Atlanta,  Georgia in 2010. The name of the group comes from a phrase that they use to describe society's obsession with keeping up appearances. Smith has been quoted as saying, "Everyone sees a duck floating smoothly on top of the water, but one rarely pays attention to how hard it kicks underneath to get where it's going."

Band members
Current members
Jesse Rankins – Lead vocalist (2012–present)
Eddie Smith III – DJ and percussion (2012–present)
Oscar White III – Guitarist (2015–present)

Past members
Jonathan Wells – Keyboards (2012–2015)

Discography

EPs

Singles

Guest appearances

See also

 List of Epic Records artists

References

External links
 Watch The Duck Official Website
 Epic Records Profile

Epic Records artists
Musical groups established in 2010
Musical groups from Atlanta
Southern hip hop groups
American musical trios
Dubstep music groups
Record production teams
African-American musical groups
2010 establishments in Alabama